Jessica Pressman is a scholar who studies electronic literature including digital poetry, media studies, and experimental literature. She creates works that examine how technologies affect reading practices that are displayed through several media forms.

Career 
She currently teaches at San Diego State University, where she is an Associate Professor of English and Comparative Literature. Pressman co-founded (with Joanna Brooks) SDSU's Digital Humanities Initiative, a faculty-led research initiative for the study of digital technologies and culture. She taught at Yale University from 2008 to 2012, as an Assistant Professor of English. Pressman also was a lecturer for the University of California's English department from 2013 to 2014.

Education 
Jessica Pressman earned her bachelor's degree in English and American Literature, minor in Women's Studies at Brandeis University. Pressman received a Ph.D. in English at the University of California, Los Angeles.

Academic work
Pressman's monograph Bookishness: Loving Books in a Digital Age examines how books still give meaning to our lives in the digital age, by serving not only as media to read through but as objects of attachment in ways that are "sentimental, fetishistic, [and] radical".

Her first book, Digital Modernism: Making it New in New Media, traces a genealogy of born-digital literature back to experimented in literary modernism and models how to adapt close reading methods to electronic literature.

In 2015, Pressman co-wrote Reading Project: A Collaborative Analysis of William Poundstone's Project for Tachistoscope (Bottomless Pit), with Mark C. Marino and Jeremy Douglass, which won the Electronic Literature Organization's "N. Katherine Hayles Award for Literary Criticism of Electronic Literature" (2016). In the case study format, the work examines the interpretation of digital poetics through three methodological approaches: critical code studies, close reading onscreen aesthetics, and data visualizations.

Pressman has also co-edited two volumes: Comparative Textual Media: Transforming the Humanities in a Postprint Era with N. Katherine Hayles (2013) and Book Presence in a Digital Age with Kiene Brillenburg Wurth and Kári Driscoll (2018).

Bibliography 
 Pressman, Jessica. "The Strategy of Digital Modernism: Young-Hae Chang Heavy Industries's Dakota." Modern Fiction Studies 54. 2 (2008): 302-326.
 Comparative Textual Media: Transforming the Humanities in the Postprint Era, co-edited with N. Katherine Hayles. University of Minnesota Press, 2013. 
 Digital Modernism: making it New in New Media : Columbia University Press, 2014. 
 Reading Project: A Collaborative Analysis of William Poundstone's Project for Tachistoscope {Bottomless Pit}, co-written with Mark C. Marino and Jeremy Douglass. University of Iowa Press, 2015. 
 Book Presence in a Digital Age , co-edited with Kiene Brillenburg Wurth and Kári Driscoll. Bloomsbury Press, 2018. 
 Bookishness: Loving Books in a Digital Age : Columbia University Press, 2020.

Awards and honors 
 International Fellow/Scholar in Residence at the University of Hamburg Germany  as part of the "Poetry in the Digital Age" project funded by the European Research Foundation's Advanced Grant April and May 2023
 Most Influential Faculty Member, SDSU, Department of English and Comparative Literature (2018, 2019, 2021)
 N. Katherine Hayles Award for Literary Criticism of Electronic Literature (2016)
 National Endowment for the Humanities (NEH) Start-Up Grant from  Office of Digital Humanities (2015- 2016)
 SDSU Area of Excellence “Digital Humanities and Global Diversity” (2015)
 American Council of Learned Societies (ACLS) for Collaborative Research Fellowship (2012-2013)
 Sarai Ribicoff Teaching Excellence Award, Yale College (2010)

References

External links

Year of birth missing (living people)
Living people
Electronic literature critics
San Diego State University faculty
Yale University faculty
University of California faculty
Brandeis University alumni
University of California, Los Angeles alumni
Electronic literature writers